The Azerbaijan Navy is the naval component of the Azerbaijani Armed Forces operating in the Caspian Sea.

History

The inception of Azerbaijani Naval Forces dates back to August 5, 1919, when the government of the Azerbaijan Democratic Republic established the navy force on the basis of the Russian Imperial fleet deployed in the Azerbaijani sector of the Caspian Sea. The navy had 6 ships. After the establishment of Soviet rule in Azerbaijan, the navy was transferred to be under the jurisdiction of the Soviet Navy. In 1991, with the collapse of the Soviet Union, the Azerbaijani fleet of the Soviet Navy was divided between Azerbaijan and the Russian Federation. In July 1992, the Azerbaijani ships were put into operation under Azerbaijani Flag in the Azerbaijani sector of the Caspian Sea. 
According to the Presidential Decree of Heydar Aliyev from 1996, August 5 was declared the Day of the Azerbaijani Navy. As of today, the Azerbaijani Navy is considered the second strongest navy in the Caspian Sea after the Russian fleet.

Jane's Fighting Ships said in their entry for the Azerbaijani Navy in their 2001–2002 edition that 'the Coast Guard was formed in July 2002 with ships transferred from the Caspian Flotilla and the Border Guard. By 1995 overall control had been resumed by the Russians in order to provide adequate maintenance and support. The aim is to be independent again in due course.' It named the navy's commander at the time as Captain Rafig Asgarov.

Organization

Naval Bases and installations

The navy operates two naval bases: one in Baku (Puta) and one for the Marines in Zığ. The current shipyard is located between Puta and Qaradagh. The Puta Base is the largest military facility in the Caspian Sea basin. Construction began on it in October 2010. It manages the Navy and provides comprehensive control over the surface conditions in the sector of the Caspian Sea belonging to Azerbaijan. There is also a Ship Repair Plant in the Navy. The site of the old Soviet Naval base in Baku is now transformed to non-military use include an arts centre.

Unit structure 
Organizationally, the Azerbaijani Navy includes:

 Main Headquarters
 Surface Ship Brigade
 Water Area Protection Division
 Division of Landing Ships
 Division of Minesweepers
 Division of Search and Rescue Vessels'
 Training Courts Division
 Brigade of Patrol Ships
Marine Infantry
641st Naval Special Operations Brigade
 Sea Sabotage and Reconnaissance Brigade
 Reserve
 Azerbaijan Coast Guard
 Patrol Ship Brigade
 Mobilization reserve
 Azerbaijan Merchant Fleet

Educational establishments 
 Faculty of the Navy, Azerbaijan Higher Military Academy (the former Azerbaijan Higher Naval Academy) – training of officers of the fleet and naval units of the border troops
 Training Center of the Azerbaijani Navy – training of warrant officers and foremen of the contract service.

Equipment

International cooperation

Cooperation with U.S. 

In 2006, the U.S. Government donated three motorboats to the Azerbaijani Navy. There is also an agreement to provide U.S. support to refurbish Azerbaijani warships in the Caspian Sea.

On May 19, 2006, the Azerbaijani and Turkish Navy held a joint military exercise on safeguarding the security of oil and gas pipelines in Baku. The training session was observed by Azerbaijan Navy commander Shahin Sultanov and Turkish Armed Forces attaché Seyhan Ceyhan. The activities aimed to ensure the safety of the Baku-Tbilisi-Ceyhan pipeline (BTC), the main export pipeline to take Caspian oil to Turkey and further on to world markets, as well as on expanding cooperation between the two countries’ military forces. The exercises started with the clearance of mines on the seabed. This was followed by rendering harmless the traps planted in the area by symbolic terrorists. The training concluded with the practice of maritime and air operations.

In 2007, an agreement between the Azerbaijani Navy and a U.S. military company was concluded, which stated that a part of the Azerbaijani Navy would be equipped with advanced laser marksmanship devices/systems. U.S. company specialists were also due to give training for the use of this new equipment.

Caspian Guard Initiative 

The Caspian Guard Initiative is a framework program designed to coordinate activities in Azerbaijan and Kazakhstan with those of U.S. Central Command and other U.S government agencies to enhance Caspian security. The initiative assists the two countries in improving their ability to prevent and, if needed, respond to terrorism, nuclear proliferation, drug and human trafficking, and other transnational threats in the Caspian region. EUCOM is responsible for operations in Azerbaijan.

Commanders

Ranks and insignia

Commissioned officer ranks
The rank insignia of commissioned officers.

Other ranks
The rank insignia of non-commissioned officers and enlisted personnel.

See also
Azerbaijani Armed Forces
Chief of General Staff of Azerbaijani Armed Forces

References 

Military of Azerbaijan
Navies by country
Riverine warfare
1992 establishments in Azerbaijan
Naval forces in the Caspian Sea